The Maule tuco-tuco (Ctenomys maulinus) is a species of rodent in the family Ctenomyidae. It is found in Argentina and Chile, where it occupies several different types of habitats. It is a common species, and the IUCN has assessed its conservation status as being of "least concern". The common and scientific names refer to a river and region in Chile within its range.

Description
C. m. maulinus is a uniform pale brown colour with a similarly coloured tail terminating in a white "pencil" or tuft of hair. By contrast, C. m. brunneus has a more intense brown colour, with the feet, the underside of the tail and the tail-tip pencil being buff-white.

Distribution and habitat
More recently, this tuco-tuco has been discovered in Neuquén Province and Río Negro Province in Argentina, but it is unclear which of the two subspecies was involved in these sightings. This tuco-tuco inhabits different habitat types, including Nothofagus and Araucaria  woodland and open areas where the soil consists of volcanic sands. The range of this species may overlap that of the social tuco-tuco (Ctenomys sociabilis).

Ecology
Like other tuco-tucos, this species is a burrowing rodent that feeds on vegetable matter such as roots and grasses. Some food is taken back to the burrow and stored there in special chambers. In a cave in Neuquén Province, Argentina, owl pellets dating back more than 5,000 years have been discovered which contain skin fragments and bones of a large species of tuco-tuco, which is probably the Maule tuco-tuco.

Status
This tuco-tuco is present in several protected areas and is assumed to have a large total population. No particular threats have been identified and any downward trend in populations is likely to be slow, so the International Union for Conservation of Nature has assessed its conservation status as being of "least concern".

References

Tuco-tucos
Mammals of Argentina
Mammals of Chile
Mammals described in 1872
Taxa named by Rodolfo Amando Philippi
Taxonomy articles created by Polbot